Zieria laevigata  commonly known as smooth zieria, smooth-leaved zieria or twiggy midge bush is a species of flowering plant in the citrus family Rutaceae and is endemic to eastern Australia. It is an erect shrub with smooth, three-part leaves and pale pink or white flowers with four petals and four stamens. It grows in poor soil on rocky outcrops and flowers from late winter to spring.

Description
Unlike those of most other zierias, the leaflets are not warty but their edges are rolled under, sometimes to the mid-rib. The upper surface is dark green but the lower one is pale green and velvety. The flowers are usually arranged in groups of three, sometimes up to 23, the groups about the same length as the leaves. Flowering occurs from August to December and the fruits which follow are present from November to December and are glabrous with scattered warts.

Taxonomy and naming
Zieria laevigata was first formally described in 1815 by Aimé Bonpland, along with Zieria smithii, Zieria microphylla (now Z.pilosa) and Zieria macrophylla (now Z. arborescens). The description was published in Bonpland's book Description des Plantes Rares cultivees a Malmaison et a Navarre. The specific epithet (laevigata) is a Latin word meaning "smooth".

Distribution and habitat
Smooth zieria is widespread and common on the coasts and nearby tablelands from near Stanthorpe in Queensland to Jervis Bay in New South Wales. It grows in poor soil on sandstone and granite outcrops, often with Eucalyptus prava.

References

laevigata
Sapindales of Australia
Flora of New South Wales
Flora of Queensland
Plants described in 1815
Taxa named by Aimé Bonpland